Turbaza "Katun" (Turbaza "Kadın") is a rural locality (a selo) in Uznezinskoye Rural Settlement of Chemalsky District, the Altai Republic, Russia. The population was 120 as of 2016. There are 4 streets.

Geography 
Turbaza "Katun" is located in the valley of the Katun River, 19 km north of Chemal (the district's administrative centre) by road. Askat is the nearest rural locality.

References 

Rural localities in Chemalsky District